Lewiston High School is a four-year public secondary school in Lewiston, Idaho, the only traditional high school in the Lewiston School District. The school colors of LHS are purple and gold and the mascot is Joe Bengal.

Athletics

Lewiston competes in IHSAA Class 5A with the largest schools in the state, and its conference is the Inland Empire League (5A) with Coeur d'Alene, Lake City, and Post Falls; all about two hours north in Kootenai County. The football rivalry with Clarkston started  in 1906, and was formerly played on Thanksgiving day.

The origin and first use of "Bengal" as the mascot is not precisely known, but the local newspaper used it for the LHS basketball team in early 1925. The former compact campus opened in 1928, and LHS athletics are conducted at various venues 

During football season, it has become a tradition for the LHS Bengals to host, "Battle of the Bridges," a football game in which the Lewiston Bengals go against their Clarkston rivals the Bantams.

During basketball season, LHS hosts "Golden Throne." This is arguably the most advertised sports event for the Bengals, and is the basketball game of the Bengals versus the Bantams. This is an annual competition where the winning school is decided on student-section spirit (cheers, rule-following, sportsmanship, etc.) and points scored during the basketball game. The winning school is given the "Golden Throne," which is a golden toilet placed upon a stand with each year in plaques with the winning school's colors as the year's background.

State titles
Boys
 Football (2): fall 1993,1996 (A-1 Div.II, now 4A) 
 Basketball (4): 1926, 1943 (north), 1948, 2009 
 Baseball (12): 1947, 1949,  1971, 1972, 1973, 1977, 1979 1984, 1986, 1993, 1995, 2006 (baseball records not kept by IHSAA, state tourney in late 1940s, canceled in 1950, re-introduced in 1971)
 Track (5): 1918, 1919, 1920, 1938, 1956 
 Golf (5): 1971, 1984, 1986, 1987, 1995 
 Tennis (1): 2013 
 Wrestling (1): 2012 

Girls
 Volleyball (2): fall 2012, 2013 
 Golf (3): 1999, 2010, 2012 
 Basketball (3): 1976, 2011, 2012

Notable alumni
 Jeep Brett, NFL end (1936–1937), class of 1932
 Jimmy Farris, NFL wide receiver (2001–2007), class of 1996
 Mike Kingsley, member of the Idaho House of Representatives
 Brad Lebo, Arena Football League quarterback (1994–1997)
 David Leroy, state attorney general (1979–1983), lieutenant governor (1983–1987), class of 1965
 Robin Lund, Major League Baseball pitching coach
 Lori McCann, member of the Idaho House of Representatives
 Jake Scott, NFL guard (2004–2012), class of 1999

References

External links

The Bengal's Purr – student newspaper
Lewiston School District
Video: LHS Lip Dub 2013 – (December 12, 2012)

Public high schools in Idaho
Lewiston, Idaho
Schools in Nez Perce County, Idaho
1888 establishments in Idaho Territory